Ottensamer is a surname. Notable people with the surname include:
Andreas Ottensamer (born 1989), Austrian classical clarinetist
Daniel Ottensamer (born 1986), Austrian clarinetist
Ernst Ottensamer (1955–2017), Austrian classical clarinetist